Dov Waxman (born June 5, 1974) is an author, academic and commentator. He is the Rosalinde and Arthur Gilbert Foundation Professor of Israel Studies at the University of California, Los Angeles (UCLA), and the director of the UCLA Younes and Soraya Nazarian Center for Israel Studies. Waxman is an internationally recognized expert on the Israeli–Palestinian conflict, Jewish–Arab relations in Israel, Israeli politics and foreign policy, Israel–United States relations, American Jewry’s relationship with Israel, Jewish politics, and contemporary Antisemitism.

Early life and education
Originally from London, England, Waxman went to Carmel College, a Jewish boarding school, and then to Oxford University for his undergraduate studies, where he became the editor of the student newspaper, Cherwell. He received his B.A. degree (with honors) in politics, philosophy and economics from Oxford University in 1996. He then undertook his graduate studies in international relations at the School of Advanced International Studies (SAIS) of Johns Hopkins University in Washington, D.C., where he received his M.A. with distinction in 1998 and his Ph.D. with distinction in 2002.

Academic career
Waxman joined the Department of Government at Bowdoin College as an assistant professor in 2002. In 2004, he moved to the City University of New York (CUNY), where he taught in the political science departments at Baruch College and the CUNY Graduate Center, becoming an associate professor with tenure in 2009. He then moved in 2014 to Northeastern University in Boston, where he was a professor of political science, international affairs, and Israel studies. He was also the co-director of Northeastern University’s Middle East Center and the director of its Middle East studies program. In 2015, he was appointed the Stotsky Professor of Jewish Historical and Cultural Studies. From 2016-2019, he was the chair of the Holocaust and Genocide Awareness Committee at Northeastern University. Waxman joined the UCLA faculty as a full professor in 2020. He holds the Rosalinde and Arthur Gilbert Foundation Chair of Israel Studies and directs the UCLA Nazarian Center for Israel Studies. Waxman has also been a visiting fellow at Oxford University, the Hebrew University of Jerusalem, Bar-Ilan University, Tel Aviv University, and the Middle East Technical University in Turkey. He also worked as a researcher at the Center for Strategic and International Studies (CSIS) in Washington, D.C., from 1997 to 1999.

From 2005 to 2015, Waxman served as a member of the Board of Directors of the Association for Israel Studies. From 2005 to 2010 he was the associate editor of the scholarly journal Israel Studies Forum (now Israel Studies Review).

Waxman is the author of numerous scholarly articles and four books. His commentary has been published in the Los Angeles Times, the Washington Post, the Guardian, the Atlantic Monthly, Salon, Foreign Policy, the Forward, Ha’aretz, and other media outlets.

Books
The Pursuit of Peace and the Crisis of Israeli Identity: Defending/Defining the Nation, New York: Palgrave Macmillan, 2006.
Israel’s Palestinians: The Conflict Within, (co-authored with Ilan Peleg),  Cambridge University Press, 2011.
Trouble in the Tribe: The American Jewish Conflict over Israel, Princeton University Press, 2016.
  The Israeli-Palestinian Conflict: What Everyone Needs to Know, Oxford: Oxford University Press, 2019.

Journal articles

References

Middle Eastern studies in the United States
American political scientists
University of California, Los Angeles faculty
University of California, Los Angeles people
University of California faculty
Alumni of the University of Oxford
Johns Hopkins University alumni
People from London
Living people
1974 births